Giannis Chloros (born 30 October 1978) is a Greek footballer who plays for A.O. Nea Ionia F.C. in the Gamma Ethniki.

Career
Born in Schwabach, Germany, Chloros moved to Greece where he began his professional career by signing for Panargiakos in July 1996. Following a few stints in the Beta Ethniki, he moved to Trikala F.C. where he appeared in 28 Alpha Ethniki matches during the 1999–00 season. He joined Egaleo F.C. in July 2000, and appeared in 137 Alpha Ethniki matches for the club over four and one-half seasons. He also played for Larissa, Iraklis and Thrasyvoulos in the Alpha Ethniki.

References

External links
Profile at Onsports.gr
 Το «μπράβο» του ΟΠΑΠ στον Χλωρό

1978 births
Living people
People from Schwabach
Sportspeople from Middle Franconia
Greek footballers
Super League Greece players
Athinaikos F.C. players
Trikala F.C. players
Egaleo F.C. players
Athlitiki Enosi Larissa F.C. players
Iraklis Thessaloniki F.C. players
Thrasyvoulos F.C. players
Doxa Drama F.C. players
Panachaiki F.C. players
A.O. Nea Ionia F.C. players
Association football forwards
Footballers from Bavaria